Gökhan Çalışal  (born 2 April 1980 in Hechingen, West Germany) is a German-Turkish former professional footballer who played as a left-back he played in the Yeni Malatyaspor in the TFF Second League and previously for Kartalspor, Boluspor, Eskişehirspor, Sakaryaspor and Sivasspor.

References

1980 births
Living people
German people of Turkish descent
Turkish footballers
Association football fullbacks
Sivasspor footballers
Sakaryaspor footballers
Boluspor footballers
Eskişehirspor footballers
Yeni Malatyaspor footballers